Rayong Football Club (Thai: สโมสรฟุตบอลจังหวัดระยอง) is a Thai professional football club based in Rayong province. They play in Thai League 2.

Stadium and locations

Seasons

P = Played
W = Games won
D = Games drawn
L = Games lost
F = Goals for
A = Goals against
Pts = Points
Pos = Final position

TPL = Thai Premier League

QR1 = First Qualifying Round
QR2 = Second Qualifying Round
QR3 = Third Qualifying Round
QR4 = Fourth Qualifying Round
RInt = Intermediate Round
R1 = Round 1
R2 = Round 2
R3 = Round 3

R4 = Round 4
R5 = Round 5
R6 = Round 6
GR = Group Stage
QF = Quarter-finals
SF = Semi-finals
RU = Runners-up
S = Shared
W = Winners

Players

Current squad

Out on loan

Club staff

Honours
Regional League Central-East Division:
Winner: 2015

References

External links 
 

Association football clubs established in 2008
Thai League 1 clubs
Football clubs in Thailand
Rayong province
2008 establishments in Thailand